Arseniy Bondarenko (born 9 October 1995) is a Belarusian professional footballer. As of 2021, he plays for Limanovia Limanowa.

References

External links 
 
 

1995 births
Living people
Belarusian footballers
Association football defenders
Belarusian expatriate footballers
Expatriate footballers in Poland
FC Dinamo Minsk players
FC Bereza-2010 players
FC Energetik-BGU Minsk players
FC Luch Minsk (2012) players
FC Dnyapro Mogilev players
FC Torpedo-BelAZ Zhodino players
FC Smolevichi players
FC Gomel players
FC Smorgon players
Limanovia Limanowa players